Yanam Municipality was created by a French Metropolitan Decree dated 12 March 1880. Yanaon municipality had 12 seats. Citizens from each ward elect one representative for Yanam Municipal Council. The term of office is six years.

General information
The Yanam Municipality is acting according to the Pondicherry Municipalities Act of 1973 which had been introduced by the Government and in effect since 26-01-1974. The Municipality is functioning under the purview of Municipal Council. In the absence of an elected local body, the Special Officer (Regional Administrator), appointed by the Government, is exercising all the powers and functions of the Municipal Council. The Commissioner, who has also been appointed by the Government, is the Chief Executive of the Municipality and also acts as the Registrar of Births and Deaths of the Municipality. Overall control and supervision is by the Director, L.A.D., Pondicherry. He also functions as the Chief Registrar of the Births and Deaths in the Union Territory of Pondicherry. The Municipality is a separate entity of self Government institution with constitutional status.

Notable people in French regime

 Bezawada Bapanya (First Mayor of Yanam, office term: 1880-1914)
 Bezawada Venkatareddy
 Bezawada Bapanaya Naidou (office term: 1925-1930)
 Kamichetty Venugopala Rao Naidu (former Mayor, office term: 1930-1940)
 Diwan Bouloussou Soubramaniam Sastroulou (Former Local councillor, Ex-Jury)
 Madimshetty Satianandam (Mayor of Yanam between 1948 and 1954)
 Samatam Krishnayya (Acting Mayor during last days of French rule in Yanaon)
 Kanakala Tatayya Naidu (MLA of Yanam during French Regime.)

Election results of 1948

In June 1948 the French and Indian Governments came to an agreement as to how the future of the French Settlements should be determined.

Municipal elections were held in Pondicherry, Karaikal, and Yanam on 24 October 1948. The two main parties were the French India Socialist Party (Socialists), who favoured the continuance of French rule, and the Indian National Congress Party, who favoured union with India. In Yanam the Socialist party was led by Kamichetty Sri Parassourama Varaprassada Rao Naidu, a strong pro-French leader and later MLA of Yanam. The Congress party was represented by Yerra Jagannatha Rao. Among the Independents, Madimchetty Satianandam was elected as mayor and performed a key role in the merging of Yanam in India. Total Seats were 12, with 3 Socialists and 9 Independents.

Members of Yanam Municipal Council in 1964
Elections were conducted in 1961 and Camidy Vincanna became Mayor and served until 1964. The composition of Yanam Municipal Council in 1964 was:
Mrs. Kamichetty Savithri, Mayor
Mr. Kamireddy China Ganapathy, First Deputy Mayor
Mr. Gueddam Zagannadham, Second Deputy Mayor 
Mr. Kona Subba Rao, Municipal Councillor
Mr. Kapaganty Pullayya, Municipal Councillor
Mr. Velaga Narayana Rao, Municipal Councillor
Mr. Chinta Ammiraju, Municipal Councillor
Mr. Recady Pattabhy, Municipal Councillor
Mr.Kudupudy Mahalakshmi, Municipal Councillor
Mr. Mohamed Abdol Hack, Municipal Councillor
Mme. Kanakala Mahalakshmamma, Municipal Councillor
Mr. Davulury Prabhavathi Devi, Municipal Councillor

Present wards of Yanam
There are 10 wards under yanam municipality
 Yanam Town
 Kanakalapeta
 Mettakur
 Farampeta (W)
 Giriyampeta (SC)
 Ambedkar Nagar (SC-W)
 Vishnalayam
 Pillaraya (W)
 Pydikondala
 Peddapudi (W)
 Aghraharam

Member of Yanam Municipality in 2006
Yanam Municipality Chairman post is reserved for SC person. Elections were held during 2006 after nearly 4 decades. Present Chairman and Vice chairman of Yanam Municipal Council was Gidla Chandra Rao and Pendem Surya Prakash. The chairman and the ten councillors of Yanam municipality were sworn in on 5 July 2006.

The councillors are:
 Gidla Chandra Rao (Chairman)
 Pendem Surya Prakash (Vice-Chairman)
 Chintakayala Venkatalakshmi
 Kapaganty Mukunda Kumar
 Gudala Parimala Devi
 Meliam Subba Rao
 Sangadi Padmavathi
 Raksha Anjaneyulu
 Chinta Nagalakshmi
 Pothabathula Haribabu
 Kavala Sathiraju

References

See also
 Municipal Administration in French India
 Pondicherry Municipality
 French East India Company
 French colonial empire
 French India
 List of mayors of Yanam

External links
 District homepage of Yanam
 Official website of the Government of the Union Territory of Pondicherry
 Indian Ministry for External Affaires - 1956 Treaty of Cession
Yanam
1880 establishments in French India
Municipalities of Puducherry